= Frank Register =

American engineer

Frank Register is an American engineer, currently the Herring Professor at University of Texas at Austin.
